Norma Crane (born Norma Anna Bella Zuckerman; November 10, 1928 — September 28, 1973) was an American actress of stage, film, and television best known for her role as Golde in the 1971 film adaptation of Fiddler on the Roof. She also starred in They Call Me Mister Tibbs! and Penelope. Crane was born in New York City, but raised in El Paso, Texas.

Biography
Born to a Jewish family in New York City and raised in El Paso, Crane studied drama at Texas State College for Women in Denton, and was a member of Elia Kazan's Actors Studio. She made her debut on Broadway in Arthur Miller's play The Crucible.

Throughout the 1950s, she appeared on a variety of live television dramas, first gaining recognition in a televised adaptation of George Orwell's 1984. She played Ellie Martin in Vincente Minnelli's film version of Tea and Sympathy. She appeared in the 1956 Alfred Hitchcock Presents episode "There Was an Old Woman" the 1958 episode "The Equalizer" and the 1959 episode “Appointment at Eleven”. Also in 1959, she portrayed “Tilda” on the TV Western Gunsmoke.

She guest-starred four times on the CBS western television series Have Gun – Will Travel with Richard Boone. She appeared on an episode of ABC's The Untouchables as Lily Dallas, a ruthless gang leader, and she appeared in two other episodes.

In 1960, Crane appeared as Sarah Prentice in the episode "River Champion" of the NBC Western series Riverboat starring Darren McGavin. A few weeks later, Crane was cast as Sarah in the episode "Deadly Tomorrow" of the ABC adventure series The Islanders, set in the South Pacific.

In 1961, Crane guest-starred in the title role in the episode "The Return of Widow Brown" of the NBC Western The Deputy. Later that year she re-appeared on Gunsmoke in an episode entitled "Perce", as well as in an episode of The Asphalt Jungle. In 1965, Crane guest-starred as Mrs. Mavis Hull in The Fugitive episode "Masquerade" and a 1968 episode of The Flying Nun.

Personal life
In 1961, she married writer-producer Herb Sargent; the marriage ended in divorce.

Death
Crane died of breast cancer at age 44 in Los Angeles, California, two years after the release of Fiddler on the Roof (1971), her last film. She is interred at Westwood Village Memorial Park Cemetery in Los Angeles.

Filmography

References

External links
 
 
 
 

1928 births
1973 deaths
Actresses from El Paso, Texas
American stage actresses
American film actresses
American television actresses
Deaths from breast cancer
Deaths from cancer in California
Burials at Westwood Village Memorial Park Cemetery
20th-century American actresses
Jewish American actresses
Texas Woman's University alumni
20th-century American Jews